The Grammy Award for Best Global Music Album is an honor presented to recording artists for influential music from around the globe at the Grammy Awards, a ceremony that was established in 1958 and originally called the Gramophone Awards. Honors in several categories are presented at the ceremony annually by the National Academy of Recording Arts and Sciences of the United States to "honor artistic achievement, technical proficiency and overall excellence in the recording industry, without regard to album sales or chart position".

History
The award for Best Global Music Album, reserved for international performers exhibiting "non-European, indigenous traditions", was first presented to Mickey Hart in 1992 for the album Planet Drum. In 1996, Academy trustees attempted to solve the problem of "compressing 75% or more of the world's music into a single award category" by broadening the definition of "world music" to include non-Western classical music. Beginning in 2001, award recipients included the producers, engineers, and/or mixers associated with the nominated work in addition to the recording artists. Following the 45th Grammy Awards (2003), the award was split into two separate categories for Best Traditional World Music Album and Best Contemporary World Music Album. In 2012, the two categories were merged back to Best World Music Album. In 2020, The Recording Academy announced it would be changing the name of the category to Best Global Music Album.

Angelique Kidjo has won the category the most, with five wins (four of which have been since 2016). The second group to win most often is Ladysmith Black Mambazo, who have won four times during the combined history of Global/World categories. Soweto Gospel Choir have three wins in the Global/World categories. In the single merged category, Ravi Shankar and Ry Cooder have both won twice. Angelique Kidjo also has the most nominations in the combined Global/World history with twelve additional nominations. Anoushka Shankar has the second most nominations in the combined categories with nine nominations.

In the single, merged Global category, artists from Brazil have won the most times with five wins, the USA have won four times, Benin has also won on four occasions, India and South Africa each have three wins, Mali and France have both had artists win twice.

Recipients

 Each year is linked to the article about the Grammy Awards held that year.

See also

 Awards for world music
 List of cultural and regional genres of music
 List of Grammy Award categories

References

General
  Note: User must select the "World" category as the genre under the search feature.

Specific

External links
Official site of the Grammy Awards

 
1992 establishments in the United States
Awards established in 1992
World Music Album
World music awards